A cecogram, also known as literature for the blind, is a letter or a parcel that contains documents or items intended for visually impaired persons. Cecograms can be sent or received by such persons, as well as by organisations that provide assistance to the visually impaired. Cecograms are either partially or entirely exempt from postage.

Etymology 
The word cecogram derives from the French cécogramme. Ultimately, the word originates from the Latin caecus (blind) and the Greek grámma (γράμμα; letter, thing written).

In English, other designations exist. The Universal Postal Union (UPU) uses the term "items for the blind" (formerly, "literature for the blind"), Royal Mail uses "articles for the blind", and the United States Postal Service uses "free matter for the blind".

Origin 

In the 1800s, the advent of tactile writing systems, like braille and moon type, saw the visually impaired gain greater access to literature. In these writing systems, characters are represented by embossed symbols, known as tactile characters, that are read by passing one's fingertips over the paper.

Printing tactile characters requires paper formats larger and heavier than those used in ink printing. Posting books that use tactile characters is therefore more expensive. To offset the burden of this cost from visually impaired persons, many national postal services have established measures to allow books for the visually impaired to be posted free of charge. In 1898, Canada became one of the first nations to implement such measures through legislation.

In 1952, the UPU moved to exempt post containing documents printed in tactile characters for the visually impaired from postage. Henceforth, all member states of the United Nations have been bound to honour this exemption. The term cécogramme (cecogram) has been used by the UPU to designate such post officially since 1964.

Regulation 

The Universal Postal Union officially defines what constitutes a cecogram on behalf of the international community.

Modern cecograms may contain documents in paper and digital formats. These include texts printed with tactile characters, tactile graphics, audio CDs, flash drives and hard drives. Other items designed to assist persons dealing with challenges inherent to visual impairment, such as white canes and braille watches, may also be included in cecograms.

Unlike ordinary letters and parcels, cecograms should be easy to open and close. The contents of cecograms are routinely inspected by postal workers in order to ensure that senders are not abusing the cecogram's exemption from postage. Including items in cecograms other than those expressly created for the visually impaired is prohibited.

The international cecogram symbol, a white-on-black pictogram depicting a person using a white cane, should be placed on the exterior of any cecogram. It should measure . Furthermore, it should be indicated in writing on the exterior that the letter or parcel is indeed a cecogram.

In order to enable communication between sighted and visually impaired persons, it is now possible to send cecograms online. Through a web form, the sender enters the address of the recipient and a message. The message is then printed in braille and posted. This service, like any other cecogram service, is normally free of charge.

See also 
Air mail
Franchise stamp
Free frank
Freepost
Postal censorship
Semi-postal stamp

References

External links 
Braille Post, a Belgian non-profit organisation which sends cecograms for free at the request of its users (available only in French, Dutch and German)
Canada Post — Literature for the Blind
Japan Post — Postal items for the blind
Swiss Post — Items for the blind

Blindness
Blindness equipment
Braille
Braille technology
Letters (message)
Pictograms
Postal history
Postal markings
Postal systems
Universal Postal Union